John Haynes (fl. 1730–1750) was a British draughtsman and engraver. His life is known only from internal evidence in his works. He was apparently working in York.

Works
Haynes drew and engraved some views of York and Scarborough for Thomas Gent's History of Kingston-on-Hull. He also drew many  plates for Francis Drake's Eboracum, published in 1736. In 1740 he published an etching from his own drawing of The Dropping Well at Knaresborough as it appeared in the Great Frost, January 1739. A view of the Duke of Cumberland's Mandarine Yacht at Windsor was engraved by Haynes in 1753, and a large plan of the city of York in 1748. Richard Gough was of the view that Haynes was more successful at providing drawings for William Henry Toms and others to engrave, than as an engraver in his own right.

Notes

Attribution

British draughtsmen
British engravers
18th-century British people
Year of birth missing
Year of death missing